The Texarkana Moonlight Murders, a term coined by the contemporary press, was a series of four unsolved serial murders and related violent crimes committed in and around the Texarkana region of Arkansas and Texas in the late winter and spring of 1946. They were attributed to an alleged unidentified serial killer known as the Phantom of Texarkana or simply the Phantom Killer or Phantom Slayer. This hypothetical perpetrator is credited with attacking eight people, of whom five died, in a ten-week period.

The attacks occurred at night on weekends between February 22 and May 3, targeting male-female pairs. The first three attacks were at lovers' lanes or quiet stretches of road on the Texas side; the fourth attack occurred at an isolated farmhouse in Arkansas. The murders were reported nationally and internationally by several publications, and caused a state of panic in Texarkana throughout the summer. Residents armed themselves and, at dusk, locked themselves indoors while police patrolled streets and neighborhoods. Stores sold out of guns, ammunition, locks, and many other protective devices. Some youths attempted to bait and ambush the killer.

Investigations were conducted at the city, county, state and federal level. In the course of investigations, there have been shifting opinions by officials over whether the first and fourth attacks were committed by the same perpetrator. The prime suspect in the case was Youell Swinney, a career petty criminal who was linked to the murders primarily by statements from his wife plus additional circumstantial evidence. After Swinney's wife refused to testify against him, prosecutors decided against pursuing murder charges. Swinney was convicted on other charges and sentenced to a long term as a habitual car thief and forger. Two of the lead investigators believed him to be guilty of the murders. The book The Phantom Killer: Unlocking the Mystery of the Texarkana Serial Murders (2014) concludes that Swinney is the culprit. The events inspired many works, including the 1976 film The Town That Dreaded Sundown. This film is the basis for much of the subsequent myth and folklore around the murders.

Crimes
The Texarkana Moonlight Murders involve four violent attacks which occurred over ten weeks from February to May 1946 in and around Texarkana, twin cities at the border of Miller County, Arkansas, and Bowie County, Texas, United States. All four attacks targeted male-female pairs in isolated locations, on weekend nights. The attacks took place at intervals of three to four weeks. Investigators speculated that the attacks were the work of an unidentified serial killer.

February 22: First attack

At around 11:45 p.m. on Friday, February 22, 1946, Jimmy Hollis, age 25, and his girlfriend, Mary Jeanne Larey, age 19, parked on a secluded road known as a lovers' lane after having seen a movie together. Around ten minutes later, a man wearing a white cloth maskwhich resembled a pillowcase with eye holes cut outappeared at Hollis's driver-side door, and shone a flashlight in the window. Hollis told him he had the wrong person, to which the man responded: "I don't want to kill you, fellow, so do what I say."

Both Hollis and Larey were ordered out the driver-side door, and the man ordered Hollis to "take off [his] goddamn britches." After he complied, the man struck him in the head twice with a pistol. Larey later told investigators that the noise was so loud she had initially thought Hollis had been shot, but it was his skull fracturing. Thinking the assailant wanted to rob them, Larey showed him Hollis's wallet to prove he had no money, after which she was struck with a blunt object. The assailant ordered her to stand, and when she did, told her to run. Initially, she tried to flee toward a ditch, but the assailant ordered her to run up the road.

Larey spotted an old car parked off the road but found it empty, and was again confronted by the attacker, who asked her why she was running. When she said that he had told her to do so, he called her a liar before knocking her down and sexually assaulting her with the barrel of his gun. After the assault, Larey fled on foot, running a half-mile (800 m) to a nearby house; she woke the residents of the house and phoned the police.

Meanwhile, Hollis had regained consciousness and alerted a passing motorist who also called the police. Within thirty minutes, Bowie County Sheriff W. H. "Bill" Presley and three other officers arrived at the scene of the attack, but the assailant had already left. Larey was hospitalized overnight for a minor head wound. Hollis was hospitalized for several days to recover from multiple skull fractures.

Hollis and Larey gave conflicting reports of their attacker: Larey claimed that she could see under the mask that he was a light-skinned African American. Hollis alternately claimed it was a tanned white man, and around 30 years old, but conceded he could not distinguish his features as he had been blinded by a flashlight. Law enforcement repeatedly challenged Larey's account, and believed that she and Hollis knew the identity of their attacker and were covering for him.

March 24: First double-murder
Richard L. Griffin, age 29, and his girlfriend of six weeks, Polly Ann Moore, age 17, were found dead in Griffin's car on the morning of Sunday, March 24, 1946, by a passing motorist. The motorist saw the parked car on a lovers' lane 100 yards (91 m) south of US Highway 67 West in Texas. The motorist at first thought that both were asleep. Griffin was found between the front seats on his knees with his head resting on his crossed hands and his pockets turned inside out; Moore was found sprawled face-down in the back seat. There is evidence that suggests she was placed there after being killed on a blanket outside the car.

Griffin had been shot twice while in the car; both had been shot once in the back of the head, and both were fully clothed. A blood-soaked patch of earth near the car suggested to police that they had been killed outside the car and placed back inside. Congealed blood was found covering the running board, and it had flowed through the bottom of the car door. A .32 cartridge casing was also found, possibly ejected from a pistol wrapped in a blanket.

No extant reports indicate that either Griffin or Moore was examined by a pathologist. Contemporaneous local rumor said that Moore had been sexually assaulted, but modern reports refute this claim.

April 14: Second double-murder

At around 1:30 a.m. on Sunday, April 14, Paul Martin, age 17, picked up Betty Jo Booker, age 15, from a musical performance at the VFW Club at West Fourth and Oak Street. Martin's body was found at around 6:30 a.m. later that morning, lying on its left side by the northern edge of North Park Road. Blood was found on the other side of the road by a fence. He had been shot four times: through the nose, through the ribs from behind, in the right hand, and through the back of the neck.

Booker's body was found by a search party at about 11:30 a.m., almost  from Martin's body. Her body was behind a tree and lying on its back, fully clothed. It was posed with the right hand in the pocket of the buttoned overcoat. Booker had been shot twice, once through the chest and once in the face. The weapon used was the same as in the first double-murder, a .32 automatic Colt pistol.

It was parked outside Spring Lake Park with the keys still in it. The authorities were not sure who was shot first. Sheriff Presley and Texas Ranger Captain Manuel Gonzaullas said that examinations of the bodies indicated that they both had put up a terrific struggle. Martin's friend, Tom Albritton, said that he did not believe an argument had happened between the victims and that Martin had not had any enemies.

May 3: Fifth murder
He was sitting in an armchair reading the newspaper when he was shot twice in the back of the head from a closed double window. Hearing the sound of broken glass, Katie came from another room and saw Virgil stand up then slump back into his chair. When she realized he was dead, she ran to the wall-crank telephone to call the police. She rang twice before being shot twice in the face from the same window. She fell but soon regained her footing and tried to get a pistol from another room, but was blinded by her own blood. She heard the killer at the back of the house and fled out the front door. She ran barefoot across the street to her sister and brother-in-law's house. Because no one was home, she ran to a neighbor A. V. Prater's house, gasped that "Virgil's dead", then collapsed.

Prater shot a rifle in the air to summon another neighbor, Elmer Taylor, who Prater sent to collect his car. Taylor complied and, along with the Prater family, took Katie Starks to Michael Meagher Hospital (now Miller County Health Unit). Starks was questioned in the operating room by Miller County Sheriff W. E. Davis, who became head of the investigation. Four days later, Davis talked with Starks again, and she discounted a circulating rumor that Virgil had heard a car outside their home several nights in a row and feared being killed.

Investigations

Investigations of the attacks involved numerous law enforcement officers at the city, county, state and federal levels.  Notable investigators include:
William Hardy "Bill" Presley (1895–1972), the Bowie County Sheriff who was the first lawman on the scene of the first three attacks.
Jackson Neely "Jack" Runnels (1897–1966), the Texarkana, Texas, chief of police who was among the first called to the scenes of the two double-murders.
W. E. Davis, the Miller County Sheriff who headed the investigation of the Starks murder.
Max Andrew Tackett (1912–1972), an Arkansas State Police Detective who was first on the scene of the Starks attack and the arresting officer of the lead suspect.
Tillman Byron Johnson (1911–2008), a Miller Country Chief Sheriff's Deputy who was one of the leading investigators on the case. He became the "go to" man for the coordinating the case and kept personal case files which survived the official files which went missing. He was the last surviving lawman from the case and was often contacted by interested parties, including television producers.
Manuel Trazazas "Lone Wolf" Gonzaullas (1891–1977), a Texas Ranger Captain who became the public face of the investigation by holding numerous press conferences. He was criticized as a "showman" who presented the work of other officers as his own and spent a great deal of time with female reporters. Five years after the murders, he left the Rangers to become a technical consultant to the entertainment industry.

Law enforcement repeatedly challenged Larey's account of the first attack, and believed that she and Hollis knew the identity of their attacker and were covering for him. No suspects were apprehended. Larey returned to Texarkana after the Griffin-Moore murders in hopes of helping to link the cases and identify the killer, but the Texas Rangers questioned her story and insisted that she knew who her attacker was. Officers did not publicly connect the Hollis-Larey attack to the subsequent murders until May 11, the day after a Texarkana Gazette interview with Larey was published, when Presley and Runnels called on the public to immediately report anyone who had an unexplained absence on the nights of the four attacks.

In response to the Griffin-Moore murders, police launched a citywide investigation along with the Texas and Arkansas city police, the Texas Department of Public Safety (the overseeing agency of the Texas Rangers), Miller and Cass County sheriffs' departments, and the Federal Bureau of Investigation (FBI). Over 200 persons were questioned in the case, and about the same number of false leads were checked. Three people found with bloody clothing were taken into custody; all three were cleared of suspicion.

In the Martin-Booker case, friends, acquaintances, and several suspects were questioned in the Bowie Country building by officers who worked in 24-hour relays.

Gonzaullas tried baiting the Phantom by recruiting teenagers to sit as decoys in parked cars while officers waited nearby. Officers also volunteered as decoys, with real partners or mannequins. Following the Booker-Martin murders, some officers hid in trees at Spring Lake Park.

In the aftermath of the May 3 Starks murder, officers from the entire area were called upon to help in the investigation. Blockades were effected on Highway 67 East. Those who had been driving in the area near the time of the slaying, along with several men found in the vicinity, were detained for questioning. By May 5, forty-seven officers were working to solve the murder. On May 9, a mobile radio station arrived with twenty Arkansas state police officers and a fleet of ten prowl cars equipped with two-way radios, to help coordinate the growing investigation. On May 11, a teletype machine was installed in the Bowie County Sheriff's office to connect with other law-enforcement offices in Texas. The unofficial theory for a motive amongst the majority of officers was that of "sex mania", as large amounts of money in the home were not taken, nor was Katie Starks's purse.

By March 30, police had posted a $500 reward in an effort to gain any new information on the case, but this produced over 100 false leads with no fruitful clues or suspects. Within days of the Booker-Martin murders, the reward fund had exceeded $1,700. It rose to $7,025 on the night of the Starks murder and passed $10,000 in the following ten days.

There was some hesitation in linking the Starks murder to the other crimes, because the weapon used was a .22, and Davis believed it was an automatic rifle. By November 1948, authorities no longer considered the Starks murder connected to the two double-murders.

Public reaction

The Griffin-Moore murders raised public concerns but were generally taken as an isolated incident, as officials did not publicly connect the earlier Hollis-Larey attack to the murders while the Phantom Killer was active. The Martin-Booker murders thus greatly alarmed the public to the likelihood of a serial predator. The deaths of these two church-going teenagers shocked the community. Booker had been a popular high-school junior, a sorority member, an officer of her high school band, a winner of scholastic, literary and musical prizes, and a former Little Miss Texarkana. Her high school ended classes early so that hundreds of young people could attend the funerals. Curfews were set for businesses in an attempt to keep people off the streets at night. It was additionally at this point that the hypothesized serial killer was dubbed "The Phantom Killer" by local media.

Hysteria grew in the days following the murder of Virgil Starks in his home. There was constant media coverage of the increased police activity and the Texarkana Gazette stated on May 5 that the killer might strike again at any moment, at any place, and at anyone. For a week police were inundated with reports of prowlers. One officer stated that nearly all of the alarm was the result of excitement, wild imagination, and near-hysteria.

Previously, it had been normal for houses to be left unlocked. The murders alarmed residents into taking precautions with security: from locking doors to arming themselves with guns; some people nailed sheets over their windows, some nailed windows down and some used screen-door braces as window guards. The day after Starks's death, stores sold out of locks, guns, ammunition, window shades and Venetian blinds. Additional items of which sales increased included window sash locks, screen door hooks, night latches, and other protective devices. Guard dogs were sought in local want-ads. 

Because citizens were considerably nervous and armed with guns, Texarkana became a dangerous place. When calling on an address, law enforcement officers would turn on their sirens, stand in their headlights, and announce themselves to keep from being shot by a nervous homeowner. Gonzaullas fuelled the hysteria when he announced on May 7 that citizens should "oil up their guns and see if they are loaded" and to "not hesitate" if they feel it necessary to use them.

The fear was significant enough to spread to other cities, including Hope, Lufkin, Magnolia, and as far as Oklahoma City, where there were sales spikes for guns and axes. After three weeks without an associated murder, Texarkana's fear began to lessen. The concern lasted throughout the summer and subsided after three months had passed.

Rumors

The rampant spreading of rumors fed the panic and made the police investigations more difficult. On April 18, Gonzaullas held a press conference to dispel rumors that the murderer had been caught. He stated that the rumors circulating among the public and in the newspapers were "a hindrance to the investigation and harmful to innocent persons." He stressed this again in a radio interview on May 7: "[rumors] only take the officers from the main route of the investigation. It is so important that we capture this man that we cannot afford to overlook any lead, no matter how fantastic it may seem."

Rumors continued to be spread through mid-May. Many people believed that the slayer had been caught. Some believed he was being secretly held at the Bowie County Jail or flown to another jail. The Gazette and News offices were drowned with phone calls, both local and long distance, inquiring about the apprehension of the killer. Presley declared that innocent people were being accused of being the Phantom and asked residents to show more consideration for their fellow citizens.

Vigilantism

Although most of the town was in fear of the Phantom, some youths continued parking on deserted roads, hoping to apprehend the perpetrator. Johnson and an Arkansas State Trooper were patrolling a vacant road at night when they came up to a parked car. When Johnson approached the car and noticed a couple, he introduced himself and asked if they weren't scared. The girl replied, "It's a good thing you told me who you are," and she revealed that she had been pointing a .25 ACP pistol at him.

On the night of May 10, Texarkana City Police officers were alerted to a car that had been following a bus. They chased it for  before shooting the tires and arresting C. J. Lauderdale Jr., a high-school athlete. When questioned at the station, he explained that he was unaware they were policemen because they were driving an unmarked car. He said he was following the bus because he was suspicious of a passenger that had entered from a private car. On May 12, Gonzaullas gave a warning to "teenage sleuths" in the Gazette, saying, "it's a good way to get killed."

The killer

"The Phantom Killer"
The unidentified killer did not acquire a nickname until after the deaths of Booker and Martin. In the April 16 edition of the Texarkana Daily News, a heading read "Phantom Killer Eludes Officers as Investigation of Slayings Pressed". This front-page story was continued on page two with the headline, "Phantom Slayer Eludes Police". The Texarkana Gazette contained a small title on April 17 which read, "Phantom Slayer Still at Large as Probe Continues". J. Q. Mahaffey, executive editor of the Texarkana Gazette in 1946, said that managing editor Calvin Sutton had an acute sense for the dramatic, which impelled him to ask if they could refer to the unknown murderer as "The Phantom". Mahaffey replied, "Why not? If the SOB continues to elude capture, he certainly can be called a phantom!"

Description
Jimmy Hollis and Mary Jeanne Larey were the only victims able to give a description of their attacker. Although Hollis believed he was a young, dark-tanned, white man under 30 years old, Larey believed he was a light-skinned African American. With no description from the other incidents, it cannot be certain if the same perpetrator or perpetrators were responsible, though it is generally assumed that the crimes were the work of a single individual.

Method of operation
The modus operandi established for the killer was that he attacked young couples in empty or private areas just outside city limits using a .32 caliber gun. Although the caliber used in the Starks murder was a .22, a .32 was still believed by the majority of lawmen to have been used by the Phantom. He always attacked late at night on weekends, with cooling off periods of about three weeks between attacks.

Profile
Gonzaullas stated that he and his officers were dealing with a "shrewd criminal who had left no stone unturned to conceal his identity and activities," and that the murderer's efforts were both clever and baffling. He also stated that the man they were hunting was a "cunning individual who would go to all lengths to avoid apprehension."

At the Starks murder scene, Presley said, "This killer is the luckiest person I have ever known. No one sees him, hears him in time, or can identify him in any way." Officers have said that the killer is apparently a maniac who is an expert with a gun. Victim and survivor Hollis said, "I know he's crazy. The crazy things he said made me feel that his mind was warped."

Dr. Anthony Lapalla, a psychologist at the Federal Correctional Institution in Texarkana, believed at the time that the killer was planning to continue to make unexpected attacks such as that of Virgil Starks on the outskirts of town. He also believed that the same person committed all five murders, and that the killer was somewhere between his mid-30s and 50, apparently motivated by a strong sex drive and sadism. Lapella stated that a person who would commit such crimes was intelligent, clever, and shrewd, and often was not apprehended.

According to Lapalla's theories, the killer was not afraid of the police activity, but was aware of the increased difficulty of attacking people on vacant roads and so he had shifted his target to a farmhouse. He said that the killer could be leading a normal life, was unlikely a veteran, and was not necessarily a resident of the area despite his knowledge of it. He stated that the attacks show evidence of deep planning, that the killer works alone and tells no one of his crimes, and could either shift his crimes to a distant community or overcome the desire to assault and kill people. Lapalla did not believe the killer was a black man because "in general, negro criminals are not that clever."

Suspects
Throughout the investigations of the Phantom Killer case, almost 400 suspects were arrested.

There were numerous false confessions investigated by police. Tackett recalled nine people who confessed to being the Phantom, but their statements did not agree with the facts.

In the Hollis and Larey case, no suspects were apprehended.

In the Griffin and Moore case, over 200 persons were questioned, and about the same number of false tips and leads were checked. Three suspects were taken into custody for bloody clothing, two of whom were released after officers received satisfying explanations. The remaining suspect was held in Vernon, Texas, for further investigation, but was later cleared of suspicion.

Youell Swinney

Youell Swinney was a 29-year-old car thief and counterfeiter. He was arrested in July by Tackett, who was investigating car thefts after realizing that on the night of the Griffin-Moore murders a car had been stolen in the area and a previously stolen car had been found abandoned. Tackett was able to locate the former car and arrested Swinney's wife Peggy when she came to retrieve it. Peggy confessed in great detail that Swinney was the Phantom Killer and had killed Booker and Martin. Her story changed in some details across several interviews, and police believed she was withholding information due to fear of Swinney or of incriminating herself.

Police were able to independently verify some details of Peggy's confession, such as the location of a victim's possessions where she said Youell had discarded them. There was considerable circumstantial evidence against Swinney, but Peggy's confession was the most critical part of the case. However, Peggy recanted her confession, was considered an unreliable witness, and could not be compelled to testify against her husband.

Law enforcement officers worked for six months trying to validate Peggy's confession and tie Swinney to the murders. They found that on the night of the Booker-Martin murders, the Swinneys were sleeping in their car under a bridge near San Antonio. Swinney was never charged with murder and was instead tried and imprisoned as a habitual offender for car theft. Presley reported in his 2014 book that investigators in the Swinney case later said that the sentence was effectively a plea bargain, though the case files indicated no formal agreement. Swinney was apparently concerned about being sentenced to death for the murders, so agreed to not contest the habitual offender charge and in fact tried to plead guilty despite the charge requiring a jury trial.

H. B. "Doodie" Tennison
Henry Booker "Doodie" Tennison was an 18-year-old university freshman who died by suicide on November 4, 1948, leaving behind cryptic instructions which directed investigators to a suicide note in which Tennison confessed to the Booker, Martin, and Starks murders. He had played trombone in the same high-school band as Booker, but they were not friends. Investigators were unable to find any other evidence linking Tennison to the murders. James Freeman, a friend of Tennison, provided an alibi for the night of the Starks murder, stating that they had been playing cards that evening when they heard the news of the attack.

Ralph B. Baumann
Ralph B. Baumann, a 21-year-old ex-Army Air Force (AAF) machine-gunner, claimed to have awoken from a fugue state of several weeks on the day of the Starks murder, with his rifle missing. He said that he heard about a suspect matching his description and hitchhiked to Los Angeles, feeling like he was running from murder. On May 23, he told Los Angeles police that he thought he might be the Phantom. "I'm my own suspect," he said.

Police arrested him but Gonzaullas stated that several parts of the man's story had little basis in fact. Baumann said that he'd been discharged from the AAF for being a psychoneurotic, and he had previously confessed to killing three people in Texarkana in a period of three days (which did not match the timeline of killings).

Saxophone peddler
Investigators had hoped that Booker's saxophone, which she had played the night of her murder and which was missing, might lead them to a suspect.  On April 27, a suspicious man was arrested in Corpus Christi, Texas, for trying to sell a saxophone to a music store. He had asked about selling the instrument to the store but became evasive and fled from the store manager." Although no saxophone was found in his possession, the police found a bag of bloody clothing in his hotel room. After several days of questioning, the man was cleared as a suspect. Booker's saxophone was located on October 24, six months after her murder,  in underbrush near the place her body had been found.

German prisoner of war
On May 8, it was announced that an escaped German prisoner of war—who was already being hunted as "a matter of routine"—was considered a suspect. He was described as a stocky 24-year-old, weighing , with brown hair and blue eyes. He had stolen a car in Mount Ida, Arkansas, and attempted to buy ammunition in several eastern Oklahoma towns. The police kept searching for the POW, but it was said that he had "vanished into thin air."

Unknown hitchhiker
On May 7, a hitchhiker armed with a pistol carjacked and robbed a man, threatening to kill him and stating that he had killed five people in Texarkana, naming Martin and Booker. The hitchhiker went on to say that he was not finished killing people. Gonzaullas said that police were doubtful that this man was the Phantom Killer, noting that the killer had gone to lengths to conceal his identity while the hitchhiker boasted to a living witness.

Atoka County suspect
On May 10, in Atoka, Oklahoma, a man assaulted a woman in her home, ranting that he might as well kill her because he had already killed three or four people, and that he was going to rape her. He then fled. A widespread search for the man included 20 officers and 160 residents. Two days later, police arrested a suspect but did not believe this man was the Phantom. According to the man's story, he could not have been in Texarkana at the time of the Starks murder.

Sammie
Sammie is a pseudonym given to a longtime Texarkana resident with a good reputation whom the police were reluctant to name as a suspect. His vehicle's tire tracks were found across the road from Martin's corpse. He failed a polygraph test so the police decided to have him hypnotized by psychiatrist Travis Elliott. Elliott concluded that Sammie had no criminal tendencies, that he had pulled his vehicle to the side of the road in order to urinate, and that he subsequently visited a married woman with whom he was having an affair—concealing this caused Sammie to fail the polygraph test. After police verified the details, they cleared Sammie as a suspect.

Taxi driver
A taxi driver became a major suspect in the Booker-Marin murders because his cab was seen in the vicinity of the crime scene that morning, but he was soon cleared.

Earl McSpadden
The body's left arm and leg had been severed by a freight train a half-hour earlier. The coroner's jury's verdict stated, "death at the hands of persons unknown", and that "he was dead before being placed on the railroad tracks." Because the murder is unsolved, locals have speculated that McSpadden was the Phantom's sixth victim. A prominent rumor exists claiming that McSpadden was the Phantom, and had committed suicide by jumping in front of a train.

In media
Film:
 In 1976, Texarkana native Charles B. Pierce made the film The Town That Dreaded Sundown, based on Gonzaullas's investigation into the murders. Since 2003, it has been screened annually at 'Movies in the Park' by Texarkana Parks & Recreation. The film was released on Blu-ray by Scream Factory in 2013.
In 2014, a meta-sequel/remake with the same name was released.
 In the movie Seven Psychopaths (2012), a short flashback segment shows a couple setting a trap for the "Texarkana Moonlight Murderer".
 Murder in the Moonlight (2018)

Television:
 Chiller's Killer Legends (2014)
 KDFW's The Tex Files: Phantom Killer (2002)
 TLC's Ultimate Ten: Unsolved Crime Mysteries (2001)
 In 2017, the CW series Riverdale aired the episode "The Town That Dreaded Sundown".
Video games:

 In Let It Die, the Texas Farmer set is based on Hollis and Larey's description of the killer.

Music:
 In 2007, the band The Bad Detectives recorded the song "Texarkana Moonlight", which is about the crimes.

Theatre:
 In 2010, a play called The Phantom Killer debuted in Manhattan at the Abingdon Theatre Company's Dorothy Strelsin Theatre. It was written by Jan Buttram, who grew up in the Oak Grove community near DeKalb, Texas.

Literature (Non-Fiction):
 Corroborating Evidence by William T. Rasmussen (October 15, 2005)
 Death in a Texas Desert: And Other True Crime Stories from The Dallas Observer by Carlton Stowers (January 30, 2003)
 Haunted Route 66: Ghosts of America's Legendary Highway by Richard Southall (February 8, 2013)
 Lone Wolf Gonzaullas, Texas Ranger by Brownson Malsch (September 15, 1998)
 The Phantom Killer: Unlocking the Mystery of the Texarkana Serial Murders by James Presley (November 15, 2014)
 The Texarkana Moonlight Murders: The Unsolved Case of the 1946 Phantom Killer by Michael Newton (May 14, 2013)
 Texas Confidential: Sex, Scandal, Murder, and Mayhem in the Lone Star State by Michael J. Varhola (July 19, 2011)
 Texas Ranger Tales: Stories That Need Telling by Mike Cox (April 1, 1997)
 Time of the Rangers: Texas Rangers: From 1900 to the Present by Mike Cox (August 18, 2009)

Literature (fiction):
 The Dark Inside by Rod Reynolds
 Betty Jo's Rose by Robert Stewart (May 31, 2012)
 It's a Marvelous Night for a Moondance by Flo Fitzpatrick (April 8, 2011)
 Untied Shoelace by Pam Kumpe (February 6, 2014)
  "Unshackled Courage" by Pam Kumpe (May 27, 2018) takes place in 1976; investigator Annie Grace solves the cold case of the Phantom Killer while "The Town that Dreaded Sundown" is being filmed in Texarkana.

See also 
 List of fugitives from justice who disappeared
 List of serial killers in the United States
 Alphabet murders

Notes

References

Works cited

External links

 Dallas Observer: The Phantom Menace
 Arkansas Life: Phantom Memories
 Fox16: The Texarkana Phantom Killer
 WKMS Radio interview with James Presley

1946 in Arkansas
1946 in Texas
1946 murders in the United States
American murderers of children
Deaths by firearm in Texas
Fugitives
Murder in Texas
People murdered in Texas
Serial murders in the United States
Texarkana, Texas
Unidentified American serial killers
Unsolved murders in the United States